The Apostolic Assembly of the Faith in Christ Jesus (Apostolic Assembly) is the oldest bilingual Oneness Pentecostal denomination in the United States. It was founded in 1925 and incorporated in California on March 15, 1930, and is currently headquartered in Fontana, California. Although most of its congregations are in the United States, the Apostolic Assembly has churches around  the world. The current Bishop President is Bishop Felipe Salazar.

History 

The Apostolic Assembly is one of many denominations that grew out of the Azusa Street Revival movement.

The Apostolic Assembly of The Faith in Christ Jesus (AAFCJ) took a historic step in 1929. In a convention celebrated in Indio, California and with the election of Brother Antonio C. Nava as the third President, it was finally decided to incorporate the Apostolic Assembly of The Faith in Christ Jesus. This decision is taken with the blessing of the Pentecostal Assemblies of the World  and it marks the moment where the Assembly changes from being an informal association into a legal organization. By 1930 the first and at the same time sixth convention of the Apostolic Assembly was held in San Bernardino, California.

See also

 Iglesia Apostólica de la Fe en Cristo Jesús
 Church of Our Lord Jesus Christ of the Apostolic Faith
 Pentecostal Assemblies of the World

References

Further reading
Cox, Harvey (2001).  Fire from Heaven:  The Rise of Pentecostal Spirituality and the Reshaping of Religion in the 21st Century.  Da Capo Press.  Note:  Harvey Cox is a professor at the Harvard Divinity School.
Gaxiola-Gaxiola, Manuel J. (1970).  La serpiente y la paloma;: Análisis del crecimiento de la Iglesia Apostólica de la Fe en Cristo Jesús de México.  Calif., W. Carey Library.  Note: Gaxiola-Gaxiola, an expert on Latin American Pentecostalism, is former president of the Society for Pentecostal Studies.
Martinez, Juan et al. (2004).  Iglesias Peregrinas en Busca de Identidad: Cuadros del Protestantismo Latino en los Estados Unidos.  Ediciones Kairos and CEHILA.  Note:  Juan Martinez is a professor at the Fuller Theological Seminary in Pasadena, California.
Ramirez, Daniel (2002).  "Antonio Castaneda Nava: Charisma, Culture, and Caudillismo" in James R. Goff and Grant Wacker, editors. Portraits of a Generation: Early Pentecostal Leaders.  University of Arkansas Press, pp. 289–309.  Note:  Ramirez is assistant professor of Religious Studies at Arizona State University.
Martin del Campo, Ismael. Cosechando en el Field. Norwalk: Editorial Nueva Vision, 2004. Note: Author is the Bishop of Los Angeles and wrote the History of the Apostolic Assembly in the book Iglesias Peregrinas en Busca de Identidad: Cuadros del Protestantismo Latino en los Estados Unidos this book is his expanded version.

External links 
Apostolic Assembly of the Faith in Christ Jesus (Official Website)

Christian organizations established in 1925
Oneness Pentecostal denominations
Pentecostal denominations established in the 20th century